The geology of Uzbekistan consists of two microcontinents and the remnants of oceanic crust, which fused together into a tectonically complex but resource rich land mass during the Paleozoic, before becoming draped in thick, primarily marine sedimentary units.

Geologic history, stratigraphy and tectonics 
Uzbekistan's Variscan Paleozoic basement rock is divided into eight main zones. The Karakum-Tajik microcontinent has four tectonic zones in the metamorphic basement rock. The lower units of the southern Baysoon Unit are mainly late Proterozoic high-pressure metamorphic rocks—mainly meta-ultramafic or meta-acidic, gray and coarse. The exact origin of these rocks is uncertain, although they are inferred to have originated from island arc volcanism. They are overlain by unmetamorphosed carbonates from the late Silurian through the middle Devonian, with an angular unconformity at the base.

The tectonic zone to the north has greater meta-pelagic rock presence and rare fossils from the Cambrian. The two peaks of metamorphic activity in the Karakum-Tajik microcontinent is associated with the time when the oceanic crust of the Turkestan Ocean subducted beneath the edge of the microcontinent. Collision with the Kazakh microcontinent produced a second pulse of metamorphism.

Metamorphic rocks are present at the base of volcanic rocks, along with recrystallized limestone. Basalt lava flows, tuff, limestone and sandstone from the early and middle Carboniferous overlie these rocks, with a thickness of three kilometers. Diabase dikes, gabbro and serpentinite are also common.

The Karakum-Tajik microcontinent's other two zones cold high-temperature, but low-pressure metamorphic ophiolite complexes, overlain by Ordovician and Silurian flysch, tuff, andesite lava and shallow-water sandstone.

Rocks left over from the Turkestan Ocean crust form allochthon units on the northern edge of the Karakum-Tajik microcontinent. In the western part of the Turkestan structure, in the Kyzylkum Desert, andesite lava flows and tuff overlie Ordovician-Silurian carbonate and pelite. Nappe formations, such as the Kulkuduk Unit are composed of basal serptinized dunite and lherzolite, with overlying harzburgite and layered gabbro. These are cut by granite dikes and intrusions and are overlain by tube basalt, pillow basalt and sedimentary rocks such as ophiolite breccia, green and red pelagic shales, limestone and olistoliths.

Geologists separate the Kazakh microcontinent into two zones: the Tamdy and Kurama units. The base of the Tamdy Unit is metabasic and metasedimentary rocks ranging from a few hundred meters to a few kilometers thick and reaching blueschist grade on the sequence of metamorphic facies. The lowermost unit is a serpentinized ultramafic mélange with eclogite fragments. It underlies Silurian-Devonian terrestrial and carbonate sedimentary rocks. These rocks are overlain by conglomerate and flysch from the Carboniferous, as well as acid tuff and Permian continental conglomerates.

By contrast, the Kurama Unit has Proterozoic paragneiss, orthogneiss and granite intrusions in its basement rocks. Isotope dating indicates ages ranging from 1.9 billion to 230 million years ago for the metamorphic rocks. Vendian age sandstone and conglomerate intercalate with basalt, limestone and tuff, unconformably overlying the basement rock. Typically, these units are one to two kilometers thick. The Kurama Unit has volcanic rocks from the Ordovician, Silurian turbidites and andesite flows. An angular unconformity separates these rocks from a Devonian molasse unit, striking to the northeast with layers of andesite and tuff and overlain by a  Devonian to Carboniferous carbonate unit. A  volcanic unit caps the sequence, extending into Early Triassic age.

Platform cover: Mesozoic-Cenozoic 
Sedimentary rocks deposited on top of the two microcontinents beginning in the Mesozoic. Faulting during the Triassic through the Early Cretaceous limited deposition to only a few small depressions. Sandstone, shale and conglomerate from the Triassic are found in the Ustyurt Plateau and southern Uzbekistan, containing units of bauxite deposited above an unconformity. Particularly in the Fergana Basin and the Kughitang and Zaravshansky ridges or the Gasly-Bukhara Depression, Jurassic coal and fine grained sedimentary rocks are more common, with thicknesses of 150 to 300 meters. Late Jurassic deposits are similar in thickness and include cross-bedded sandstone and conglomerate.

Aptian and Albian age (based on marine fossils) gray sandstone, limestone and shale are more common in the west and south.

In southern Uzbekistan, they are notable as oil and gas-bearing reservoir formations. Copper-rich sandstone is found close to the Gissar area. Except in the east, where bauxite and continental sandstone formed, the Cretaceous immersed Uzbekistan in a shallow sea that left behind limestone and gypsum.

With the beginning of the Cenozoic, in the Paleogene deposition changed leaving behind a sequence with thick green clay at the base, overlain by limestone and then sandstone and clay in the east.

The thickest sedimentary rocks in the platform cover are from the Neogene. The lower unit, dubbed E type, includes sandstone, shale and conglomerate with layers of gypsum and salt. The Middle Pliocene unit is up to 3.4 kilometers thick and deposited in connection with rapid uplift of the Tien Shan mountains. The second type of sedimentation—W type—includes one kilometer of lacustrine carbonate with small layers of gypsum, sandstone and salt, as well as a  top unit of red shale and sandstone.

During the last 2.5 million years in the Quaternary, sedimentary rocks deposited in river valleys, and repeating layers with conglomerate at the base ascending to sandstone and shale indicate four different phases of uplift.

See also

Citations

Works cited